When Knights Were Bold may refer to:

 When Knights Were Bold (play), a 1906 play by Harriett Jay
 When Knights Were Bold (1916 British film), a 1916 British comedy film
 When Knights Were Bold (1916 Italian film), a 1916 Italian comedy film
 When Knights Were Bold (1929 film), a 1929 British adventure film
 When Knights Were Bold (1936 film), a 1936 British comedy film
 When Knighthood Was in Flower (novel), an 1898 American novel sometimes referred to by this title